Albert Parish, New South Wales is a remote civil parish of Yantara County near Milparinka, New South Wales.

The parish is on the Silver City Highway where the road meets Salt Lake, New South Wales.
The parish has a Köppen climate classification of BWh (Hot desert).

Gold was discovered there, and for a while a village at Albert had a population of 900. but the gold soon ran out and life in the parish is very hard as it is arid and has no reliable fresh water.

See also
 Albert, New South Wales
 Lake Albert, New South Wales
 Albert Parish (Delialah County), New South Wales
 Albert Parish (Yancowinna County) New South Wales
 Albert, (Drake County) New South Wales
 Albert, (Kennedy County) New South Wales
 Albert, (Macquarie County) New South Wales
 Albert, (Sandon County) New South Wales
 Albert, (St Vincent County) New South Wales

References

Parishes of Tongowoko County
Far West (New South Wales)